Ricky Fataar (born 5 September 1952) is a South African-English multi-instrumentalist of Cape Malay descent, who has performed as both a drummer and a guitarist. He gained fame as an actor in The Rutles: All You Need Is Cash, a spoof on the actual history of the Beatles in which he also performed as a member of The Rutles.  He is also known for his stint as a member of The Beach Boys between 1971 and 1974. Fataar is also recognized for his contributions as a record producer, and has worked on projects scoring music to film and television.

Music career

The Flames
Fataar's first childhood band was The Flames, a band from his birthplace of Durban, South Africa. He joined the band at the age of nine. The band made several recordings as well as touring all over southern Africa and before long they became quite popular in South Africa. By the time he was twelve years old he had already won the honour of being voted as the "Best Rock Drummer in South Africa".

In 1968, the band moved to London and began touring in the United Kingdom. On one of their tours, they were spotted by a founding member of The Beach Boys, Carl Wilson. He was impressed by their talent and offered to sign them to the Beach Boys new record label, Brother Records. The band moved to Los Angeles and they recorded and released their 1970 album The Flame  with Carl Wilson producing the album.

The Beach Boys
The Flames disbanded in late 1970, and Fataar and his former Flame bandmate Blondie Chaplin were recruited by The Beach Boys, in March 1972. Fataar was asked to play drums for the band after drummer Dennis Wilson suffered a debilitating hand accident. The duo recorded two albums with the Beach Boys, and began touring with them in 1971. The 1972 Beach Boys album Carl and the Passions – "So Tough" featured musical and vocal contributions from Chaplin and Fataar. It also included two songs written by the duo, "Here She Comes" and "Hold On Dear Brother". On the band's next album, Holland, released a year later, both musicians recorded, and provided backing vocals, including the hit single "Sail On, Sailor", on which Chaplin sang as lead vocalist.

They also collaborated with Carl Wilson and Mike Love on the song "Leaving This Town". 1973 saw the first live album The Beach Boys in Concert, upon which Fataar performed. It featured a live version of the previously unreleased Chaplin/Fataar/Love collaboration "We Got Love", which was originally intended to be released on the Holland album, but was removed from the running order to make way for single "Sail On, Sailor". Both Fataar and Chaplin would later depart the band, with Fataar only appearing on the tracks "It's OK" and "That Same Song" off the Beach Boys' next studio album, 1976's 15 Big Ones.

In March 2019, Big Noise's Al Gomes and Connie Watrous presented a plaque from Roger Williams University to Fataar in Providence, RI at a sold-out Bonnie Raitt/James Taylor concert. The plaque commemorates The Beach Boys' 22 September 1971 concert at The Ramada Inn in Portsmouth, Rhode Island, now Roger Williams University's Baypoint Inn & Conference Center. The concert was the first-ever appearance of Fataar as an official member of the band, essentially changing The Beach Boys' live and recording line-up into a multi-cultural group.

The Rutles
In 1978, Fataar starred in All You Need Is Cash, a mockumentary film known more commonly as The Rutles, a spoof on the real life history of the Beatles, which was a follow up to a Saturday Night Live television sketch. The Beatlesque music for the Rutles was written by Neil Innes, formerly of the Bonzo Dog Doo-Dah Band and musical collaborator with Monty Python. Fataar's character was Stig O'Hara, the band's guitarist (analogous to George Harrison). He speaks no dialogue in the film, being sent up as "the quiet one" in it. Fataar's then wife, Penelope Tree, also appeared in All You Need Is Cash, as Stig's wife, Penelope. The band's two records, The Rutles and Archeology, featured him playing guitar, bass, sitar, drums, and singing. He would also go on to record a single with Eric Idle as 'Dirk & Stig' titled, "Mr. Sheene" / "Ging Gang Goolie".

Collaborations 

With Bonnie Raitt
 Green Light (Warner Bros. Records, 1982)
 Nick of Time (Capitol Records, 1989)
 Luck of the Draw (Capitol Records, 1991)
 Longing in Their Hearts (Capitol Records, 1994)
 Silver Lining (Capitol Records, 2002)
 Souls Alike (Capitol Records, 2005)
 Slipstream (Redwing Records, 2012)
 Dig In Deep (Redwing Records, 2016)
 Just Like That... (Redwing Records, 2022)

With Keb' Mo'
 Just like You (Epic Records, 1996)

With Tim Finn
 Escapade (Mushroom Records, 1983)
 Before & After (Capitol Records, 1994)

With Anne Murray
 Anne Murray (EMI, 1996)

With Peter Cetera
 Peter Cetera (Warner Bros. Records, 1981)

With Etta James
 Seven Year Itch (Island Records, 1989)

With Ryan Adams
 Love Is Hell (Lost Highway Records, 2004)

With Wendy Matthews
 Émigré (rooArt, 1990)
 Lily (rooArt, 1992)

With Jennifer Warnes
 Shot Through the Heart (Arista Records, 1978)

With Pops Staples
 Peace to the Neighborhood (Point Blank Records, 1992)

With Jenny Morris
 Body and Soul (Warner Bros. Records, 1987)
 Shiver (Warner Bros. Records, 1989)
 Honeychild (East West Records, 1991)

With Boz Scaggs
 Some Change (Virgin Records, 1994)
 Fade Into Light (MVP Japan, 1996)
 Come on Home (Virgin Records, 1997)
 Out of the Blues (Concord Records, 2018)

With Delbert McClinton
 Nothing Personal (New West, 2001)

With Tim Hardin
 Unforgiven (San Francisco Sound, 1980)

With Phoebe Snow
 Something Real (Elektra Records, 1989)

With Crowded House
 Woodface (Capitol Records, 1991)

With Robert Palmer
 Heavy Nova (Manhattan Records, 1988)

With Elton John
 Duets (Geffen, 1993)

With Steve Harley
 Hobo with a Grin (EMI, 1978)

Awards and nominations

ARIA Music Awards
The ARIA Music Awards is an annual awards ceremony that recognises excellence, innovation, and achievement across all genres of Australian music. They commenced in 1987. 

! 
|-
| 1993
| Spotswood
| Best Original Soundtrack, Cast or Show Album
| 
| 
|-

Countdown Australian Music Awards
Countdown was an Australian pop music TV series on national broadcaster ABC-TV from 1974 to 1987, it presented music awards from 1979 to 1987, initially in conjunction with magazine TV Week. The TV Week / Countdown Awards were a combination of popular-voted and peer-voted awards.

|-
| 1983
| himself (with Mark Moffatt) for work with Tim Finn, Renée Geyer & Pat Wilson) 
| Best Record Producer of the Year
| 
|-
| 1984
| himself (with Mark Moffatt) 
| Best Producer
| 
|-

Other projects

Film and television scores
Fataar has also combined his talents as an actor and a musician, developing musical scores for both film and television. An example includes the composition of the score for an Australian film Spotswood.

As recording producer
Working in his capacity as producer, Fataar has produced the music for various films that include High Tide, Les Patterson Saves the World, and The Coca-Cola Kid, in which he makes a cameo appearance as an actor as well.

Other work
Fataar has worked as a session musician, notably for Ian McLagan as well as other artists, as a drummer. 
Fataar emigrated to Australia in 1978 where he recorded with and co-produced albums for Tim Finn, played the drums on the Split Enz song "Message To My Girl", and also worked with Crowded House, Jenny Morris, Peter Blakeley, and Wendy Matthews as well as various other artists.

In 1979 Fataar was introduced to Bonnie Raitt, and recorded on her Green Light album. In 1990, he joined up with Raitt, and has been a member of Raitt's band. Fataar continued to work in between other projects as a sideman for many artists, also on Peter Cetera's first album, usually as a drummer.

Personal life
Ricky Fataar was married to the fashion model Penelope Tree with whom he had one child, Paloma Fataar.  Later he married dancer Valerie Velardi, with whom he had a second daughter, Francesca Fataar.

References

1952 births
Living people
Musicians from Durban
South African expatriates in the United Kingdom
South African expatriates in the United States
South African emigrants to Australia
South African rock musicians
The Beach Boys members
The Rutles members
South African session musicians
South African record producers
Rock guitarists
Pedal steel guitarists
South African people of Malay descent
South African drummers